Counties Manukau (often known as the Counties Manukau Steelers) are a New Zealand professional rugby union team based in Pukekohe, New Zealand. The union was originally established in 1955, with the National Provincial Championship established in 1976. They now play in the reformed National Provincial Championship competition. They play their home games at Navigation Homes Stadium in Pukekohe in the Auckland region. The team is affiliated with the Chiefs Super Rugby franchise. Their home playing colours are black, white and red.

Current squad

The Counties Manukau Steelers squad for the 2022 Bunnings NPC is:

Honours

Counties Manukau have been overall Champions on one occasion, winning the title in 1979. Their full list of honours include:

National Provincial Championship First Division
Winners: 1979

National Provincial Championship Second Division
Winners: 1993

ITM Cup Championship Division
Winners: 2012

Current Super Rugby players
Players named in the 2022 Counties Manukau Steelers squad, who also earned contracts or were named in a squad for any side participating in the 2022 Super Rugby Pacific season.

References

External links
Official site

National Provincial Championship
New Zealand rugby union teams
Rugby union in the Auckland Region